The 2015 Asian Women's Volleyball Championship was the eighteenth edition of the Asian Championship, a biennial international volleyball tournament organised by the Asian Volleyball Confederation (AVC) with Chinese Volleyball Association (CVA). The tournament was held in Tianjin, China from 20 to 28 May 2015.

Qualification 
If there were fewer than 16 teams applied for participation, all teams compete in the tournament.
If there were more than 16 teams applied for participation, participated teams would be determined by:
– The host nation
– Top 10 ranked teams from the previous edition
– Representatives from each of the five Asian Volleyball Confederation Zonal Associations

Qualified teams

Pools composition
The teams were seeded based on their final ranking at the 2013 Asian Women's Volleyball Championship. The host country and the top 7 ranked teams were seed in the Serpentine system. The 8 remaining teams were drawn on 11 February 2015 in Bangkok, Thailand. Ranking from the previous edition was shown in brackets except the host (who ranked 4th) and the teams who did not participate, which were denoted by (-). Japan played in the Asian Championship with their U-23 national team.

* Withdrew

Venues

Squads

Pool standing procedure
 Numbers of matches won
 Match points
 Sets ratio
 Points ratio
 Result of the last match between the tied teams

Match won 3–0 or 3–1: 3 match points for the winner, 0 match points for the loser
Match won 3–2: 2 match points for the winner, 1 match point for the loser
§

Preliminary round
 All times are China standard time (UTC+08:00).

Pool A

|}

|}

Pool B

|}

|}

Pool C

|}

|}

Pool D

|}

|}

Second round
All times are China standard time (UTC+08:00).
  The results and the points of the matches between the same teams that were already played during the preliminary round shall be taken into account for the classification round.

Pool E

|}

|}

Pool F

|}

|}

Pool G

|}

|}

Pool H

|}

|}

Classification round
All times are China standard time (UTC+08:00).

Classification 9th–12th

Semifinals

|}

11th place

|}

9th place

|}

Final round
All times are China standard time (UTC+08:00).

Final eight

Quarterfinals

|}

5th–8th semifinals

|}

Semifinals

|}

7th place

|}

5th place

|}

3rd place

|}

Final

|}

Final standing

Awards

Most Valuable Player	
  Zhu Ting
Best Setter
  Shen Jingsi
Best Outside Spikers
  Zhu Ting
  Kim Yeon-koung
	
Best Middle Blocker	
  Pleumjit Thinkaow
Best Opposite Spiker
  Zeng Chunlei
Best Libero
  Nam Jie-youn

See also
2015 Asian Men's Volleyball Championship

References

External links
 Official Website
 Regulations

Asian women's volleyball championships
2015 in Chinese women's sport
Asian Women's Volleyball Championship
International volleyball competitions hosted by China
Sports competitions in Tianjin
May 2015 sports events in China
21st century in Tianjin